The Temple Street gang also known as "TST" is a street gang in the downtown Los Angeles area and was founded by Filipino and Mexican youths in the 1920s and 1930s. The gang is involved in murders, assaults, burglaries, drug trafficking.

Rampart scandal 
Rafael Pérez framed four members of the Temple Street gang as being associated with the murder of Mexican Mafia member Miguel "Lizard" Malfavon. The incident took place at a McDonald's on Alvarado Street, where four supposed members all planned to kill Malfavon while he tried to collect "taxes" from the gang. Pérez found a material witness who had blood on her dress, and she named four gang members from Temple Street. He repeatedly changed the name of the main killer and ended up framing Anthony "Stymie" Adams as the one who fatally shot Malfavon in the head with a rifle in the neighboring apartment.

References 

Asian-American gangs
Latino street gangs
Hispanic-American gangs
Gangs in Los Angeles
Filipino-American culture in California
Hispanic and Latino American culture in Los Angeles